Superconductivity is a set of physical properties observed in certain materials where electrical resistance vanishes and magnetic flux fields are expelled from the material. Any material exhibiting these properties is a superconductor. Unlike an ordinary metallic conductor, whose resistance decreases gradually as its temperature is lowered, even down to near absolute zero, a superconductor has a characteristic critical temperature below which the resistance drops abruptly to zero.
  An electric current through a loop of superconducting wire can persist indefinitely with no power source.

The superconductivity phenomenon was discovered in 1911 by Dutch physicist Heike Kamerlingh Onnes. Like ferromagnetism and atomic spectral lines, superconductivity is a phenomenon which can only be explained by quantum mechanics. It is characterized by the Meissner effect, the complete ejection of magnetic field lines from the interior of the superconductor during its transitions into the superconducting state. The occurrence of the Meissner effect indicates that superconductivity cannot be understood simply as the idealization of perfect conductivity in classical physics.

In 1986, it was discovered that some cuprate-perovskite ceramic materials have a critical temperature above . Such a high transition temperature is theoretically impossible for a conventional superconductor, leading the materials to be termed high-temperature superconductors. The cheaply available coolant liquid nitrogen boils at 77 K, and thus the existence of superconductivity at higher temperatures than this facilitates many experiments and applications that are less practical at lower temperatures.

Classification 

There are many criteria by which superconductors are classified. The most common are:

Response to a magnetic field 
A superconductor can be Type I, meaning it has a single critical field, above which all superconductivity is lost and below which the magnetic field is completely expelled from the superconductor; or Type II, meaning it has two critical fields, between which it allows partial penetration of the magnetic field through isolated points. These points are called vortices. Furthermore, in multicomponent superconductors it is possible to have a combination of the two behaviours. In that case the superconductor is of Type-1.5.

By theory of operation 
It is conventional if it can be explained by the BCS theory or its derivatives, or unconventional, otherwise. Alternatively, a superconductor is called unconventional if the superconducting order parameter transforms according to a non-trivial irreducible representation of the point group or space group of the system.

By critical temperature 
A superconductor is generally considered high-temperature if it reaches a superconducting state above a temperature of 30 K (−243.15 °C); as in the initial discovery by Georg Bednorz and K. Alex Müller. It may also reference materials that transition to superconductivity when cooled using liquid nitrogen – that is, at only Tc > 77 K, although this is generally used only to emphasize that liquid nitrogen coolant is sufficient. Low temperature superconductors refer to materials with a critical temperature below 30 K, and are cooled mainly by liquid helium (Tc > 4.2 K). One exception to this rule is the iron pnictide group of superconductors which display behaviour and properties typical of high-temperature superconductors, yet some of the group have critical temperatures below 30 K.

By material 

Superconductor material classes include chemical elements (e.g. mercury or lead), alloys (such as niobium–titanium, germanium–niobium, and niobium nitride), ceramics (YBCO and magnesium diboride), superconducting pnictides (like fluorine-doped LaOFeAs) or organic superconductors (fullerenes and carbon nanotubes; though perhaps these examples should be included among the chemical elements, as they are composed entirely of carbon).

Elementary properties of superconductors 

Several  physical properties of superconductors vary from material to material, such as the critical temperature, the value of the superconducting gap, the critical magnetic field, and the critical current density at which superconductivity is destroyed.  On the other hand, there is a class of properties that are independent of the underlying material. The Meissner effect, the quantization of the magnetic flux or permanent currents, i.e. the state of zero resistance are the most important examples. The existence of these "universal" properties is rooted in the nature of the broken symmetry of the superconductor and the emergence of off-diagonal long range order.  Superconductivity is a thermodynamic phase, and thus possesses certain distinguishing properties which are largely independent of microscopic details.

Off diagonal long range order is closely connected to the formation of Cooper pairs. An article by V.F. Weisskopf presents simple physical explanations for the formation of Cooper pairs, for the origin of the attractive force causing the binding of the pairs, for the finite energy gap, and for the existence of permanent currents.

Zero electrical DC resistance 

The simplest method to measure the electrical resistance of a sample of some material is to place it in an electrical circuit in series with a current source I and measure the resulting voltage V across the sample. The resistance of the sample is given by Ohm's law as R = V / I. If the voltage is zero, this means that the resistance is zero.

Superconductors are also able to maintain a current with no applied voltage whatsoever, a property exploited in superconducting electromagnets such as those found in MRI machines. Experiments have demonstrated that currents in superconducting coils can persist for years without any measurable degradation. Experimental evidence points to a current lifetime of at least 100,000 years. Theoretical estimates for the lifetime of a persistent current can exceed the estimated lifetime of the universe, depending on the wire geometry and the temperature. In practice, currents injected in superconducting coils have persisted for more than 27 years (as of August, 2022) in superconducting gravimeters. In such instruments, the measurement principle is based on the monitoring of the levitation of a superconducting niobium sphere with a mass of 4 grams.

In a normal conductor, an electric current may be visualized as a fluid of electrons moving across a heavy ionic lattice. The electrons are constantly colliding with the ions in the lattice, and during each collision some of the energy carried by the current is absorbed by the lattice and converted into heat, which is essentially the vibrational kinetic energy of the lattice ions. As a result, the energy carried by the current is constantly being dissipated. This is the phenomenon of electrical resistance and Joule heating.

The situation is different in a superconductor. In a conventional superconductor, the electronic fluid cannot be resolved into individual electrons. Instead, it consists of bound pairs of electrons known as Cooper pairs. This pairing is caused by an attractive force between electrons from the exchange of phonons. This pairing is very weak, and small thermal vibrations can fracture the bond. Due to quantum mechanics, the energy spectrum of this Cooper pair fluid possesses an energy gap, meaning there is a minimum amount of energy ΔE that must be supplied in order to excite the fluid. Therefore, if ΔE is larger than the thermal energy of the lattice, given by kT, where k is Boltzmann's constant and T is the temperature, the fluid will not be scattered by the lattice. The Cooper pair fluid is thus a superfluid, meaning it can flow without energy dissipation.

In a class of superconductors known as type II superconductors, including all known high-temperature superconductors, an extremely low but nonzero resistivity appears at temperatures not too far below the nominal superconducting transition when an electric current is applied in conjunction with a strong magnetic field, which may be caused by the electric current. This is due to the motion of magnetic vortices in the electronic superfluid, which dissipates some of the energy carried by the current. If the current is sufficiently small, the vortices are stationary, and the resistivity vanishes. The resistance due to this effect is tiny compared with that of non-superconducting materials, but must be taken into account in sensitive experiments. However, as the temperature decreases far enough below the nominal superconducting transition, these vortices can become frozen into a disordered but stationary phase known as a "vortex glass". Below this vortex glass transition temperature, the resistance of the material becomes truly zero.

Phase transition  

In superconducting materials, the characteristics of superconductivity appear when the temperature T is lowered below a critical temperature Tc. The value of this critical temperature varies from material to material. Conventional superconductors usually have critical temperatures ranging from around 20 K to less than 1 K. Solid mercury, for example, has a critical temperature of 4.2 K. As of 2015, the highest critical temperature found for a conventional superconductor is 203 K for H2S, although high pressures of approximately 90 gigapascals were required. Cuprate superconductors can have much higher critical temperatures: YBa2Cu3O7, one of the first cuprate superconductors to be discovered, has a critical temperature above 90 K, and mercury-based cuprates have been found with critical temperatures in excess of 130 K. The basic physical mechanism responsible for the high critical temperature is not yet clear. However, it is clear that a two-electron pairing is involved, although the nature of the pairing ( wave vs.  wave) remains controversial.

Similarly, at a fixed temperature below the critical temperature, superconducting materials cease to superconduct when an external magnetic field is applied which is greater than the critical magnetic field. This is because the Gibbs free energy of the superconducting phase increases quadratically with the magnetic field while the free energy of the normal phase is roughly independent of the magnetic field. If the material superconducts in the absence of a field, then the superconducting phase free energy is lower than that of the normal phase and so for some finite value of the magnetic field (proportional to the square root of the difference of the free energies at zero magnetic field) the two free energies will be equal and a phase transition to the normal phase will occur. More generally, a higher temperature and a stronger magnetic field lead to a smaller fraction of electrons that are superconducting and consequently to a longer London penetration depth of external magnetic fields and currents. The penetration depth becomes infinite at the phase transition.

The onset of superconductivity is accompanied by abrupt changes in various physical properties, which is the hallmark of a phase transition. For example, the electronic heat capacity is proportional to the temperature in the normal (non-superconducting) regime. At the superconducting transition, it suffers a discontinuous jump and thereafter ceases to be linear. At low temperatures, it varies instead as e−α/T for some constant, α. This exponential behavior is one of the pieces of evidence for the existence of the energy gap.

The order of the superconducting phase transition was long a matter of debate. Experiments indicate that the transition is second-order, meaning there is no latent heat. However, in the presence of an external magnetic field there is latent heat, because the superconducting phase has a lower entropy below the critical temperature than the normal phase. It has been experimentally demonstrated that, as a consequence, when the magnetic field is increased beyond the critical field, the resulting phase transition leads to a decrease in the temperature of the superconducting material.

Calculations in the 1970s suggested that it may actually be weakly first-order due to the effect of long-range fluctuations in the electromagnetic field. In the 1980s it was shown theoretically with the help of a disorder field theory, in which the vortex lines of the superconductor play a major role, that the transition is of second order within the type II regime and of first order (i.e., latent heat) within the type I regime, and that the two regions are separated by a tricritical point. The results were strongly supported by Monte Carlo computer simulations.

Meissner effect 

When a superconductor is placed in a weak external magnetic field H, and cooled below its transition temperature, the magnetic field is ejected. The Meissner effect does not cause the field to be completely ejected but instead, the field penetrates the superconductor but only to a very small distance, characterized by a parameter λ, called the London penetration depth, decaying exponentially to zero within the bulk of the material. The Meissner effect is a defining characteristic of superconductivity. For most superconductors, the London penetration depth is on the order of 100 nm.

The Meissner effect is sometimes confused with the kind of diamagnetism one would expect in a perfect electrical conductor: according to Lenz's law, when a changing magnetic field is applied to a conductor, it will induce an electric current in the conductor that creates an opposing magnetic field. In a perfect conductor, an arbitrarily large current can be induced, and the resulting magnetic field exactly cancels the applied field.

The Meissner effect is distinct from thisit is the spontaneous expulsion that occurs during transition to superconductivity. Suppose we have a material in its normal state, containing a constant internal magnetic field. When the material is cooled below the critical temperature, we would observe the abrupt expulsion of the internal magnetic field, which we would not expect based on Lenz's law.

The Meissner effect was given a phenomenological explanation by the brothers Fritz and Heinz London, who showed that the electromagnetic free energy in a superconductor is minimized provided

where H is the magnetic field and λ is the London penetration depth.

This equation, which is known as the London equation, predicts that the magnetic field in a superconductor decays exponentially from whatever value it possesses at the surface.

A superconductor with little or no magnetic field within it is said to be in the Meissner state. The Meissner state breaks down when the applied magnetic field is too large. Superconductors can be divided into two classes according to how this breakdown occurs. In Type I superconductors, superconductivity is abruptly destroyed when the strength of the applied field rises above a critical value Hc. Depending on the geometry of the sample, one may obtain an intermediate state consisting of a baroque pattern of regions of normal material carrying a magnetic field mixed with regions of superconducting material containing no field. In Type II superconductors, raising the applied field past a critical value Hc1 leads to a mixed state (also known as the vortex state) in which an increasing amount of magnetic flux penetrates the material, but there remains no resistance to the flow of electric current as long as the current is not too large. At a second critical field strength Hc2, superconductivity is destroyed. The mixed state is actually caused by vortices in the electronic superfluid, sometimes called fluxons because the flux carried by these vortices is quantized. Most pure elemental superconductors, except niobium and carbon nanotubes, are Type I, while almost all impure and compound superconductors are Type II.

London moment 
Conversely, a spinning superconductor generates a magnetic field, precisely aligned with the spin axis. The effect, the London moment, was put to good use in Gravity Probe B. This experiment measured the magnetic fields of four superconducting gyroscopes to determine their spin axes. This was critical to the experiment since it is one of the few ways to accurately determine the spin axis of an otherwise featureless sphere.

History of superconductivity 

Superconductivity was discovered on April 8, 1911 by Heike Kamerlingh Onnes, who was studying the resistance of solid mercury at cryogenic temperatures using the recently produced liquid helium as a refrigerant. At the temperature of 4.2 K, he observed that the resistance abruptly disappeared. In the same experiment, he also observed the superfluid transition of helium at 2.2 K, without recognizing its significance. The precise date and circumstances of the discovery were only reconstructed a century later, when Onnes's notebook was found. In subsequent decades, superconductivity was observed in several other materials. In 1913, lead was found to superconduct at 7 K, and in 1941 niobium nitride was found to superconduct at 16 K.

Great efforts have been devoted to finding out how and why superconductivity works; the important step occurred in 1933, when Meissner and Ochsenfeld discovered that superconductors expelled applied magnetic fields, a phenomenon which has come to be known as the Meissner effect. In 1935, Fritz and Heinz London showed that the Meissner effect was a consequence of the minimization of the electromagnetic free energy carried by superconducting current.

London constitutive equations
The theoretical model that was first conceived for superconductivity was completely classical: it is summarized by London constitutive equations. 
It was put forward by the brothers Fritz and Heinz London in 1935, shortly after the discovery that magnetic fields are expelled from superconductors. A major triumph of the equations of this theory is their ability to explain the Meissner effect, wherein a material exponentially expels all internal magnetic fields as it crosses the superconducting threshold. By using the London equation, one can obtain the dependence of the magnetic field inside the superconductor on the distance to the surface.

The two constitutive equations for a superconductor by London are:

The first equation follows from Newton's second law for superconducting electrons.

Conventional theories (1950s) 
During the 1950s, theoretical condensed matter physicists arrived at an understanding of "conventional" superconductivity, through a pair of remarkable and important theories: the phenomenological Ginzburg–Landau theory (1950) and the microscopic BCS theory (1957).

In 1950, the phenomenological Ginzburg–Landau theory of superconductivity was devised by Landau and Ginzburg. This theory, which combined Landau's theory of second-order phase transitions with a Schrödinger-like wave equation, had great success in explaining the macroscopic properties of superconductors. In particular, Abrikosov showed that Ginzburg–Landau theory predicts the division of superconductors into the two categories now referred to as Type I and Type II. Abrikosov and Ginzburg were awarded the 2003 Nobel Prize for their work (Landau had received the 1962 Nobel Prize for other work, and died in 1968). The four-dimensional extension of the Ginzburg–Landau theory, the Coleman-Weinberg model, is important in quantum field theory and cosmology.

Also in 1950, Maxwell and Reynolds et al. found that the critical temperature of a superconductor depends on the isotopic mass of the constituent element. This important discovery pointed to the electron-phonon interaction as the microscopic mechanism responsible for superconductivity.

The complete microscopic theory of superconductivity was finally proposed in 1957 by Bardeen, Cooper and Schrieffer. This BCS theory explained the superconducting current as a superfluid of Cooper pairs, pairs of electrons interacting through the exchange of phonons. For this work, the authors were awarded the Nobel Prize in 1972.

The BCS theory was set on a firmer footing in 1958, when N. N. Bogolyubov showed that the BCS wavefunction, which had originally been derived from a variational argument, could be obtained using a canonical transformation of the electronic Hamiltonian. In 1959, Lev Gor'kov showed that the BCS theory reduced to the Ginzburg–Landau theory close to the critical temperature.

Generalizations of BCS theory for conventional superconductors form the basis for the understanding of the phenomenon of superfluidity, because they fall into the lambda transition universality class. The extent to which such generalizations can be applied to unconventional superconductors is still controversial.

Further history 
The first practical application of superconductivity was developed in 1954 with Dudley Allen Buck's invention of the cryotron. Two superconductors with greatly different values of the critical magnetic field are combined to produce a fast, simple switch for computer elements.

Soon after discovering superconductivity in 1911, Kamerlingh Onnes attempted to make an electromagnet with superconducting windings but found that relatively low magnetic fields destroyed superconductivity in the materials he investigated. Much later, in 1955, G. B. Yntema succeeded in constructing a small 0.7-tesla iron-core electromagnet with superconducting niobium wire windings. Then, in 1961, J. E. Kunzler, E. Buehler, F. S. L. Hsu, and J. H. Wernick made the startling discovery that, at 4.2 kelvin, niobium–tin, a compound consisting of three parts niobium and one part tin, was capable of supporting a current density of more than 100,000 amperes per square centimeter in a magnetic field of 8.8 tesla. Despite being brittle and difficult to fabricate, niobium–tin has since proved extremely useful in supermagnets generating magnetic fields as high as 20 tesla. In 1962, T. G. Berlincourt and R. R. Hake discovered that more ductile alloys of niobium and titanium are suitable for applications up to 10 tesla. Promptly thereafter, commercial production of niobium–titanium supermagnet wire commenced at Westinghouse Electric Corporation and at Wah Chang Corporation. Although niobium–titanium boasts less-impressive superconducting properties than those of niobium–tin, niobium–titanium has, nevertheless, become the most widely used "workhorse" supermagnet material, in large measure a consequence of its very high ductility and ease of fabrication. However, both niobium–tin and niobium–titanium find wide application in MRI medical imagers, bending and focusing magnets for enormous high-energy-particle accelerators, and a host of other applications. Conectus, a European superconductivity consortium, estimated that in 2014, global economic activity for which superconductivity was indispensable amounted to about five billion euros, with MRI systems accounting for about 80% of that total.

In 1962, Josephson made the important theoretical prediction that a supercurrent can flow between two pieces of superconductor separated by a thin layer of insulator. This phenomenon, now called the Josephson effect, is exploited by superconducting devices such as SQUIDs. It is used in the most accurate available measurements of the magnetic flux quantum Φ0 = h/(2e), where h is the Planck constant. Coupled with the quantum Hall resistivity, this leads to a precise measurement of the Planck constant. Josephson was awarded the Nobel Prize for this work in 1973.

In 2008, it was proposed that the same mechanism that produces superconductivity could produce a superinsulator state in some materials, with almost infinite electrical resistance. The first development and study of superconducting Bose–Einstein condensate (BEC) in 2020 suggests that there is a "smooth transition between" BEC and Bardeen-Cooper-Shrieffer regimes.

High-temperature superconductivity 

Until 1986, physicists had believed that BCS theory forbade superconductivity at temperatures above about 30 K. In that year, Bednorz and Müller discovered superconductivity in lanthanum barium copper oxide (LBCO), a lanthanum-based cuprate perovskite material, which had a transition temperature of 35 K (Nobel Prize in Physics, 1987). It was soon found that replacing the lanthanum with yttrium (i.e., making YBCO) raised the critical temperature above 90 K.

This temperature jump is of particular engineering significance, since it allows liquid nitrogen as a refrigerant, replacing liquid helium. Liquid nitrogen can be produced relatively cheaply, even on-site. The higher temperatures additionally help to avoid some of the problems that arise at liquid helium temperatures, such as the formation of plugs of frozen air that can block cryogenic lines and cause unanticipated and potentially hazardous pressure buildup.

Many other cuprate superconductors have since been discovered, and the theory of superconductivity in these materials is one of the major outstanding challenges of theoretical condensed matter physics. There are currently two main hypotheses – the resonating-valence-bond theory, and spin fluctuation which has the most support in the research community. The second hypothesis proposed that electron pairing in high-temperature superconductors is mediated by short-range spin waves known as paramagnons.

In 2008, holographic superconductivity, which uses holographic duality or AdS/CFT correspondence theory, was proposed by Gubser, Hartnoll, Herzog, and Horowitz, as a possible explanation of high-temperature superconductivity in certain materials.

From about 1993, the highest-temperature superconductor known was a ceramic material consisting of mercury, barium, calcium, copper and oxygen (HgBa2Ca2Cu3O8+δ) with Tc = 133–138 K.

In February 2008, an iron-based family of high-temperature superconductors was discovered. Hideo Hosono, of the Tokyo Institute of Technology, and colleagues found lanthanum oxygen fluorine iron arsenide (LaO1−xFxFeAs), an oxypnictide that superconducts below 26 K. Replacing the lanthanum in LaO1−xFxFeAs with samarium leads to superconductors that work at 55 K.

In 2014 and 2015, hydrogen sulfide at extremely high pressures (around 150 gigapascals) was first predicted and then confirmed to be a high-temperature superconductor with a transition temperature of 80 K. Additionally, in 2019 it was discovered that lanthanum hydride becomes a superconductor at 250 K under a pressure of 170 gigapascals. 

In 2018, a research team from the Department of Physics, Massachusetts Institute of Technology, discovered superconductivity in bilayer graphene with one layer twisted at an angle of approximately 1.1 degrees with cooling and applying a small electric charge. Even if the experiments were not carried out in a high-temperature environment, the results are correlated less to classical but high temperature superconductors, given that no foreign atoms need to be introduced. The superconductivity effect came about as a result of electrons twisted into a vortex between the graphene layers, called "skyrmions". These act as a single particle and can pair up across the graphene's layers, leading to the basic conditions required for superconductivity.

In 2020, a room-temperature superconductor (critical temperature 288 K) made from hydrogen, carbon and sulfur under pressures of around 270 gigapascals was described in a paper in Nature. However in 2022 the article was retracted by the editors because the validity of background subtraction procedures had been called into question. All nine authors maintain that the raw data strongly support the main claims of the paper.

Applications 

Superconducting magnets are some of the most powerful electromagnets known. They are used in MRI/NMR machines, mass spectrometers, the beam-steering magnets used in particle accelerators and plasma confining magnets in some tokamaks. They can also be used for magnetic separation, where weakly magnetic particles are extracted from a background of less or non-magnetic particles, as in the pigment industries. They can also be used in large wind turbines to overcome the restrictions imposed by high electrical currents, with an industrial grade 3.6 megawatt superconducting windmill generator having been tested successfully in Denmark.

In the 1950s and 1960s, superconductors were used to build experimental digital computers using cryotron switches. More recently, superconductors have been used to make digital circuits based on rapid single flux quantum technology and RF and microwave filters for mobile phone base stations.

Superconductors are used to build Josephson junctions which are the building blocks of SQUIDs (superconducting quantum interference devices), the most sensitive magnetometers known. SQUIDs are used in scanning SQUID microscopes and magnetoencephalography. Series of Josephson devices are used to realize the SI volt. Superconducting photon detectors can be realised in a variety of device configurations.  Depending on the particular mode of operation, a superconductor–insulator–superconductor Josephson junction can be used as a photon detector or as a mixer. The large resistance change at the transition from the normal- to the superconducting state is used to build thermometers in cryogenic micro-calorimeter photon detectors. The same effect is used in ultrasensitive bolometers made from superconducting materials.  Superconducting nanowire single-photon detectors offer high speed, low noise single-photon detection and have been employed widely in advanced photon-counting applications.

Other early markets are arising where the relative efficiency, size and weight advantages of devices based on high-temperature superconductivity outweigh the additional costs involved. For example, in wind turbines the lower weight and volume of superconducting generators could lead to savings in construction and tower costs, offsetting the higher costs for the generator and lowering the total levelized cost of electricity (LCOE).

Promising future applications include high-performance smart grid, electric power transmission, transformers, power storage devices, electric motors (e.g. for vehicle propulsion, as in vactrains or maglev trains), magnetic levitation devices, fault current limiters, enhancing spintronic devices with superconducting materials, and superconducting magnetic refrigeration. However, superconductivity is sensitive to moving magnetic fields, so applications that use alternating current (e.g. transformers) will be more difficult to develop than those that rely upon direct current. Compared to traditional power lines, superconducting transmission lines are more efficient and require only a fraction of the space, which would not only lead to a better environmental performance but could also improve public acceptance for expansion of the electric grid. Another attractive industrial aspect is the ability for high power transmission at lower voltages. Advancements in the efficiency of cooling systems and use of cheap coolants such as liquid nitrogen have also significantly decreased cooling costs needed for superconductivity.

Nobel Prizes for superconductivity 
 Heike Kamerlingh Onnes (1913), "for his investigations on the properties of matter at low temperatures which led, inter alia, to the production of liquid helium".
 John Bardeen, Leon N. Cooper, and J. Robert Schrieffer (1972), "for their jointly developed theory of superconductivity, usually called the BCS-theory".
 Leo Esaki, Ivar Giaever, and Brian D. Josephson (1973), "for their experimental discoveries regarding tunneling phenomena in semiconductors and superconductors, respectively" and "for his theoretical predictions of the properties of a supercurrent through a tunnel barrier, in particular those phenomena which are generally known as the Josephson effects".
 Georg Bednorz and K. Alex Müller (1987), "for their important break-through in the discovery of superconductivity in ceramic materials".
 Alexei A. Abrikosov, Vitaly L. Ginzburg, and Anthony J. Leggett (2003), "for pioneering contributions to the theory of superconductors and superfluids".

See also 

 
 
 
  in quarks

References

Further reading 
 IEC standard 60050-815:2000, International Electrotechnical Vocabulary (IEV) – Part 815: Superconductivity
 
 
 
 
 
 
 
 
 
 Charlie Wood, Quanta Magazine (2022). "High-Temperature Superconductivity Understood at Last"

External links 

 Video about Type I Superconductors: R=0/transition temperatures/ B is a state variable/ Meissner effect/ Energy gap(Giaever)/ BCS model
 Lectures on Superconductivity (series of videos, including interviews with leading experts)
 YouTube Video Levitating magnet
 DoITPoMS Teaching and Learning Package – "Superconductivity"

 
Phases of matter
Exotic matter
Unsolved problems in physics
Magnetic levitation
Physical phenomena
Spintronics
Phase transitions
Articles containing video clips
Science and technology in the Netherlands
Dutch inventions
1911 in science